INS Kora is the lead ship of the Kora-Class of 1,350-tonne guided missile Corvettes in active service with the Indian Navy. The vessel was built at Garden Reach Shipbuilders and Engineers (GRSE) and outfitted at Mazagon Dock Limited (MDL).

She is equipped with 3M-24 Anti-Ship Missiles as a primary weapon, with two Strela-2M Anti-Air Missiles as defensive weapons.

History 
Kora was on a goodwill visit to Singapore in 2001.

On 31 October 2014, Kora was in collision with the cargo ship MV Madeleine Rickmers in the Bay of Bengal off the coast of Vishakhapatnam. INS Kora participated in the 2015 SLINEX training exercises from 27 October to 1 November. Kora took part in LIMA in 2017.

The ship has taken part extensively in various exercises in the South China Sea. She and INS Ranvijay, a Rajput class destroyer, participated in bilateral exercises with Vietnam Navy and Philippine Navy in 2021. A frigate from Philippines BRP Antonio Luna (FF 151) took part in the exercise.

References

1992 ships
Naval ships of India
Corvettes of the Indian Navy
Kora-class corvettes
Ships built in India